Bekkelaget is a village in Stange Municipality in Innlandet county, Norway. The village is located across the Åkersvika bay (part of the lake Mjøsa) from the town of Hamar. The European route E6 highway runs along the east side of Bekkelaget.

References

Stange
Villages in Innlandet